Joseph Dale Marlin LaPlante (born May 14, 1981), better known for his stage name Joey Stylez, is a Canadian singer and rapper.

Discography 

 Trap Famous (mixtape) (2006)
 Chief of the North (mixtape) (2007)
 The Blackstar (2009)
 "The Lost Filez" (2010)
 Red Makaveli (2012)
 Feather + Rosary (2013)
Medicine Man Mixtape (2014)
#GREYMAGIC (2016)
The Star Chief (2018)
Warrior Sun (2019)
3 Eye Hip (2021)
Horsethieves & Bootleggers (2023)

Awards and nominations

References

External links 
 
 Joey Stylez Makes Music for Indigenous Warriors (2016)
 Joey Stylez The Star Chief album review | Vancouver Sun (2018)
 How TV Western 'Yellowstone' Created Its Gritty World With Country, Americana Music (2019)
 How TV Western 'Yellowstone' Created Its Gritty World With Country, Americana Music (2019)
 Joey Stylez Talks New Single 'Super Power' (2019)

Living people
First Nations musicians
Cree people
Canadian male rappers
21st-century Canadian rappers
1981 births
Musicians from Saskatchewan
21st-century Canadian male musicians